Alisa Brunovna Freindlich (born 8 December 1934 in Leningrad, Soviet Union) is a Soviet and Russian actress. People's Artist of the USSR (1981). Since 1983, Freindlich has been a leading actress of the Bolshoi Drama Theater in Saint Petersburg, Russia.

Biography
Alisa Freindlich was born into the family of Bruno Freindlich, a prominent actor and People's Artist of the USSR. She is of German and Russian ancestry. Her father and paternal relatives were ethnic Germans living in Russia for more than a century. In her childhood years, Alisa Freindlich attended the drama and music classes of the Leningrad Palace of Pioneers. During World War II she survived the 900-day-long Nazi siege of Leningrad and continued her school studies after the war.

In the 1950s she studied acting at the Leningrad State Institute of Theatre, Music and Cinema, graduating in 1957 as actress. From 1957 to 1961 Alisa Freindlich was a member of the troupe at Komissarzhevskaya Theatre in Leningrad. Then she joined the Lensovet Theatre company, but in 1982, she had to leave it following her divorce from the theatre's director, Igor Vladimirov. Thereupon director Georgy Tovstonogov invited her to join the troupe of Bolshoi Drama Theater.

Although Freindlich put a premium on her stage career, she starred in several notable movies, including Eldar Ryazanov's enormously popular comedy Office Romance (1977), the long-banned epic Agony (1975) and Tarkovsky's sci-fi movie Stalker (1979). Another notable role was the Queen Anne of Austria in the Soviet TV series D'Artagnan and Three Musketeers (1978) and its later Russian sequels, Musketeers Twenty Years After (1992) and The Secret of Queen Anne or Musketeers Thirty Years After (1993).

On her 70th birthday, she was visited by Vladimir Putin in her Saint Petersburg apartment, who awarded her with the State Prize of the Russian Federation. She also received a Nika Award in 2005.

As of 2019, Freindlich was performing in nine productions of the Bolshoi Drama in Saint Petersburg, where she is a leading actress.

Selected filmography

 Unfinished Story (1955) as episode
 Talents and Admirers (1956) as episode
 Immortal Song (1957) as gymnasium student
 The City Turns the Lights On (1958) as Zina Pichikova
 The Story Of Newlyweds (1960) as Galya
 Striped Trip (1961) as barmaid
 Fro (1964) as Natasha Bukova
 The First Visitor (1965) as Tanya
 Adventures of a Dentist (1965) as Masha
 The City and the Song (1968) as singer 
 To Love (1968) as Anya 
 The Waltz (1969, TV Movie) as Marusya 
 Yesterday, Today and Forever (1969) as defendant's wife
 Family Happiness (1970) as Anna Semyonovna Kapitonova
 The Secret of the Iron Door (1970) as Lyusa Ryzhkova, Tolik's mother 
 My Life (1973) as Kleopatra Polozneva
 Acting As (1973) as Yevgenia Sinegrach
 Melodies of Vera Quarter (1973) as Alisa Akvamarinskaya
 The Taming of the Shrew (1973, TV Movie) as Katherina 
 Anna and Commodore (1974) as Anna
 The Straw Hat (1974, TV Mini-Series) as Baroness de Champigny
 Blue Puppy (1976, Cartoon)  as Blue Puppy (singing voice)
 Always with Me... (1976)  as Tanya Ilyina
 The Princess and the Pea (1977)  as Queen Mother 
 Office Romance (1977)  as Lyudmila Prokofyevna Kalugina 
 Old-Fashioned Comedy  (1978)  as Lydia Vasilievna Zherber
 Stalker (1979)  as Stalker's wife
 D'Artagnan and Three Musketeers (1979, TV Mini-Series) as Anne of Austria Queen
 Sergey Ivanovich Retires (1980) as Natasha
 Three Years (1980) as Polina Rassudina
 Dangerous Age (1981) | Lilia Ivanovna Rodimtseva
 Two Voices (1981) as  Yekaterina
 Agony (1981) as Anna Alexandrovna Vyrubova
 A Canary Cage (1983) as Olesya's mother
 A Cruel Romance (1984) as Harita Ignatievna Ogudalova
 Success (1985) as Zinaida Nikolayevna Arsenyeva
 A Simple Death (1985) as Praskovya Fedorovna 
 Forgive Me (1986) as Elizaveta Andreyevna
 The Secret of the Snow Queen (1986) as Snow Queen 
 Chekharda (1987) as Margarita Vasilievna Kudryavtseva, accompanist and second conductor
 Weekdays and Holidays of Serafima Glukina (1988) as Serafima Glukina
 Musketeers Twenty Years After (1992, TV Mini-Series) as Queen Anne of Austria
 The Secret of Queen Anne or Musketeers Thirty Years After (1994) as Queen Anne of Austria
 Katya Ismailova (1994) as Irina / mother
 Katya Ismailova (1994) as Irina Dmitrievna
 Women's Logic (2003-2006) as Olga Petrovna Tumanova 
 On Upper Maslovka Street (2005) as Anna Borisovna
 A Room and a Half (2009) as Brodsky's mother
 The Return of the Musketeers, or The Treasures of Cardinal Mazarin (2009) as Queen Anne of Austria 
 Bolshoi (2017) as Galina Beletskaya
 Thawed Carp (2017) as Lyudmila Borisovna 
 Parents of the Strict Regime (2022) as mother

Honors and awards 
Honorary titles:

Honored Artist of the RSFSR (1965)
 People's Artist of the RSFSR (1971)
People's Artist of the USSR (1981)
Honorary Member of the Russian Academy of Arts

State awards and incentives:

 RSFSR State Prize of Stanislavsky (1976)  for the performance of roles Shchegoleva, Kovaleva, Kid plays in "The Man from", "Kovalev of the province," IH Butler, "The Kid and Carlson," by Astrid Lindgren
 State Prize of the Russian Federation in Literature and Art in 1995 (27 May 1996)  for the outstanding performance of roles of the classical repertoire
 State Prize of the Russian Federation in Literature and Art in 2000 (6 June 2001)  for the performance of the Russian State Academic Bolshoi Drama Theatre Tovstonogov "Arcadia" play by Tom Stoppard
 State Prize of the Russian Federation for year 2007 (19 May 2008)  for creating artistic images that have become classics of domestic theatrical art and film
 Diploma of the President of the Russian Federation (8 December 2010) for a great contribution to the development of domestic theater and cinema art.

Orders:

Order of the Red Banner of Labour (1986)
 Order of Friendship (17 December 1994)  for services to the people associated with the development of Russian statehood, the achievements in labour, science, culture, arts, strengthening friendship and cooperation between nations
Order "For Merit to the Fatherland":
4th class (13 February 2004)   for outstanding contribution to the development of domestic theatrical art. 
3rd class (5 February 2009)   for outstanding contribution to the development of domestic theatrical art and many years of fruitful activity. 
2nd class (28 October 2019)   for outstanding contribution to the development of domestic culture and arts and many years of fruitful activity. 
Order of Honour (25 September 2014)
Other awards, prizes, promotions and public recognition:
 Nika Award for Best Supporting Actress (movie "Moscow Nights", dir. Valeri Todorovski; 1994)
 Honorary citizen of St. Petersburg (2001)
 Nika Award for Best Actress (movie "In the Upper Maslovka", dir. Konstantin Khudyakov; 2005)
 "Golden Mask" Award for best dramatic actress ("Oscar and the Pink Lady", Lensovet Theatre; 2006)

References

External links

Unofficial Fan Club of Alisa Freindlich 
Alisa Freindlich at Peoples.ru 
Eldar Ryazanov about Alisa Freindlich and making of Office Romance 

1934 births
Living people
20th-century Russian actresses
21st-century Russian actresses
Actresses from Saint Petersburg
Academicians of the Russian Academy of Cinema Arts and Sciences "Nika"
Russian people of German descent
Russian film actresses
Soviet film actresses
Russian stage actresses
Russian voice actresses
Soviet stage actresses
Soviet voice actresses
Honored Artists of the RSFSR
People's Artists of the RSFSR
People's Artists of the USSR
Recipients of the Nika Award
Recipients of the Order "For Merit to the Fatherland", 2nd class
Recipients of the Order "For Merit to the Fatherland", 3rd class
Recipients of the Order "For Merit to the Fatherland", 4th class
Recipients of the Order of the Red Banner of Labour
State Prize of the Russian Federation laureates
Honorary Members of the Russian Academy of Arts
Russian activists against the 2022 Russian invasion of Ukraine